Gran is a name. Notable people with the name include the following:
Given name or nickname
Gran Akuma (born 1974), American wrestler
Gran Cochisse (born 1952), retired Mexican Luchador, or professional wrestler
Gran Hamada, stage name of Japanese wrestler Hiroaki Hamada (born 1950)
Gran Wilson, American operatic lyric tenor

Middle name
Christen Gran Bøgh (1876–1955), Norwegian jurist, tourism promoter and theatre critic
Halfdan Gran Olsen (1910–1971), Norwegian competition rower and Olympic medalist
Jens Gran Gleditsch (1860–1931), Norwegian bishop and theologian
Kristen Gran Gleditsch (1867–1946), Norwegian military officer and topographer, brother of Jens

Surname
Albert Gran (1862–1932), Norwegian-born, American stage and film actor
Bjarne Gran (1918–1992), Norwegian journalist, historian and literary consultant
Carol Gran (née Millard; born 1941), former political figure in British Columbia
Daniel Gran (1694–1757), Austrian painter
Einar Lilloe Gran (1886–1966), Norwegian engineer and pioneer of aviation
Frauke Schmitt Gran, German orienteering competitor
Gerhard Gran (1856–1925), Norwegian literary historian, editor, essayist and biographer
Gunnar Gran (born 1931), Norwegian media executive
Haaken Hasberg Gran (1870–1955), Norwegian botanist
Heinrich Gran (active 1489–1527), German book printer
Iegor Gran (born 1964), Russian-born French novelist
Jens Gran (1794–1881), Norwegian politician
John Willem Gran (1920–2008), Norwegian bishop
Julia Gran, American graphic designer and children's book illustrator
Lars Ivar Gran (born 1959), Norwegian sprint canoeist 
Maurice Gran (born 1949), British script writer
Øyulv Gran (1902–1972), Norwegian writer
Sara Gran (born 1971), American author
Stein Gran (born 1958), Norwegian football player
Tryggve Gran DSC, MC (1888–1980), Norwegian aviator, explorer and author
Wiera Gran (1916–2007), Polish singer and actress, also known as Weronika Grynberg, Vera Gran and Mariol

See also
Gran (disambiguation)